The Institute of Nuclear Energy Research (INER) is the agency of the Atomic Energy Council of the Taiwan (ROC) dedicated to the research and development on nuclear safety, nuclear facility decommissioning, radioactive waste treatment and disposal technologies in Taiwan.

History
INER was established on 9 May 1968.

Organization
 Nuclear Instrumentation Division
 Nuclear Fuels and Materials Division
 Physics Division
 Chemical Analysis Division
 Center for Energy Economics and Strategy Research
 Mechanical and Systems Engineering Project
 Nuclear Engineering Division
 Health Physics Division
 Chemical Engineering Division
 Engineering Technology and Facility Operation Division
 Isotope Application Division
 Nuclear Backend Research Center
 Radiopharmaceuticals Production and Marketing Center
 Civil Service Ethics Office
 Accounting Office
 Personnel Office
 Secreatarial Office
 Project Planning Division
 Legal Affairs Office

See also
 Nuclear power in Taiwan

References

External links
 

1968 establishments in Taiwan
Executive Yuan
Nuclear research institutes
Research institutes established in 1968
Research institutes in Taiwan